Floored is a 2009 documentary film about the people and business of the Chicago trading floors. The film focuses specifically on several Chicago floor traders who have been impacted by the electronic trading revolution and whose jobs have been threatened by the use of computers in the trading world. Directed by James Allen Smith, the film runs for 77 minutes.

The film has become particularly relevant in light of the U.S. financial crisis of 2009; Greg Burns of the Chicago Tribune has said of the film's director, "By dealing with hard times in the workplace, Smith taps into a vein running through millions of lives in this brutal recession, as the nation’s unemployment rate soars toward 10 percent" 

Critics have suggested a meta-fictional subtext to the documentary, linking the film's storyline about Chicago traders to the plight of independent filmmakers in a time of the declining influence of film festivals and the ubiquitousness of free internet content. Ironically, the documentary itself was widely available on video sharing sites before its official "web premiere" on September 6, 2013.

Notes

External links

Review: Chicago’s Open-Outcry Traders New York Times. 2010-05-07
Trading places: From peak to FLOORED  Futures Magazine. 2013-08-13

American documentary films
2009 documentary films
2009 films
Documentary films about the Great Recession
Trading films
Documentary films about computing
Documentary films about business
Documentary films about Chicago
2000s English-language films
2000s American films